Promicromonospora vindobonensis is a bacterium from the genus Promicromonospora which has been isolated from air from the Virgilkapelle in Vienna, Austria.

References

Further reading

External links
Type strain of Promicromonospora vindobonensis at BacDive -  the Bacterial Diversity Metadatabase

Micrococcales
Bacteria described in 2003